Marion Howard Brazier (pen name, Marion Howard;  September 6, 1850 – January 15, 1935) was an American journalist, editor, author, and clubwoman of Boston. She was the author of: Perpetrations, a Book of Humor, and Cheer, Philosophy and Comfort.

Brazier served as society editor of The Boston Post, 1890–98; edited and published the Patriotic Review, 1898-1900; and society editor, The Boston Journal, 1903–11.  She was a member of sixteen organizations and founder of six, including the Professional Women's Club and the Bunker Hill and Paul Jones Chapters Daughters of the American Revolution (D.A.R.), Ex-Regents (L. A. R.) and Boston Parliamentary Law Clubs; member of Authors' Society, Drama League, Charity Club, Cremation Society, Boston Common Society, Boston Political Club, and the Woman's Charity Club.

Early life and education
Marion Howard Brazier was born in Charlestown, Massachusetts, September 6, 1850. She was the daughter William Henry and Sarah Jane (Sargent) Brazier. William Henry Brazier was a veteran of the Civil War and member of the Grand Army of the Republic. According to family tradition Mr. Brazier was descended from Sir Henry Brazier, who lived many years ago in Lincolnshire, England. The maiden name of Miss Brazier's mother was Sarah Jane Sargent. She was daughter of David Sargent (the fourth of that name in direct line) and his wife, Elizabeth I. Fille-brown, and was a descendant in the ninth generation of William Sargent, of Malden, Massachusetts, who came from Northampton, England, in 1638. William is said to have been son of Roger and grandson of Hugh Sargent, of Northamptonshire, England. Two of Brazier's ancestors on the maternal side—namely, David Sargent and Abraham Rand—were soldiers of the American Revolution, the last named serving three years in the army. His mother, Anne Devens, wife of Thomas Rand, was "probably daughter of Philip Devens" and nearly related to the family to which Judge Devens belonged.

She was graduated from the Bunker Hill Grammar School at the close of the Civil War. This completed her schooling, but not her education, which has come through her contact with the world, her ambition leading her to associate with her superiors in intellect, to keep up to date, and never to look back.

Another patriotic ancestor, John Hicks, of Cambridge, Massachusetts was slain by the British in the retreat from Lexington, Massachusetts, April 19, 1775. The Hon. Charles Saunders, former Mayor of Cambridge, first president of the Sons of the American Revolution, is also a descendant of John Hicks and second cousin to Miss Brazier.

Career

Writer

After Brazier had filled positions of trust as accountant and cashier for a number of years, her health became so seriously impaired as to demand a change of scene and occupation. In 1888, in Santa Fe, New Mexico a sudden inspiration came to her to write of the scenes in that picturesque city. Thus it happened that, in the room where General Lew Wallace had written Ben-Hur, Brazier wrote her first article for publication.

Until 1889, she labored under the disadvantage of a very delicate physique. While in California, she supplied the local and New England papers with breezy specials on many topics. was extremely varied. While travelling, she acted as special correspondent for papers in nearly every part of the country. This business she systematized, and made into a syndicate in the years when syndicates were very popular, and realized much financial gain from her venture. At that time, she was supplying as many as 60-80 newspapers a week with a letter.

Brazier conducted a clipping bureau with a specialty in personal clippings about persons prominent in society and in notes and reports relating to women's clubs and patriotic societies. She was for a long time society and club editor of the Boston Sunday Post, regular contributor to the Boston Evening Transcript, editor of a New York City society magazine, and space writer for innumerable newspapers. In addition to being a journalist, she was a biographer of many noted people.

Her writing was largely devoted to patriotic matters. The Patriotic Review, an example of historical literature, was founded by Brazier in 1898. She was its editor and publisher, and it had a good circulation before it collapsed in 1904. In that same year, she served as the society editor of the Boston Journal, and was a regular contributor to the Sunday Herald and the Globe.

Activist

Brazier held membership in the following organizations: New England Woman's Press Association; Charity Club; Actors' Church Alliance; Daughters of Veterans; U. S. W. V. Auxiliary; Daughters of New Hampshire and of Massachusetts; Woman's Club House Corporation; and in the National Society, D. A. R., in which she has founded two chapters — Bunker Hill and Paul Jones. She was also the founder of the Parliamentary Law Club. Through her efforts, the naval hero of the American Revolution was honored in Massachusetts, and a schoolhouse bears his name in East Boston.

While in Paris in 1888, she became interested in everything touching upon the connection between France and the American colonies during the revolution. She made inquiries looking to the discovery of the resting place of John Paul Jones, and afterward, strongly urged that the United States should use every means to discover the lost grave and to have the body removed to a resting place in the U.S. Brazier founded the Paul Jones Chapter, D.A.R., June 14, 1898, and through her efforts and the cooperation of several patriotic societies, a public school in Boston was named Paul Jones School, and through this same chapter, a bronze tablet was placed, the only memorial to the founder of the American navy. She arranged the dedicatory exercises, which occurred April 15, 1904. The Massachusetts Naval Brigade acted as escort to Gov. Curtis Guild, who made the address and presented the tablet to the city.

The Bunker Hill Cbapter, D.A.R. was organized on historic ground in Charlestown, June 17, 1896, with thirty-eight charter members. Its founder and first Regent was Brazier, a descendant of John Hicks, the first soldier to be killed at the Concord Bridge. Through the efforts of Brazier, it contributed many framed lithographs representing the American flag with dates showing the time of admission of states to the Boston public schools.

Personal life and death
Brazier had been living at Trinity Court in Boston before moving to Westboro, Massachusetts, where she lived for a year before her death, January 15, 1935. A brother, Frederick W. Brazier of Forest Hills, Long Island, New York, survived her.

Selected works
 Fred's hard fight, 1873
 Stage and screen., 1920
 Perpetrations wise and otherwise, 1925
 The Professional Women's Club, 1907-1927, 1927
 John Paul Jones, founder of the American Navy., 1929

References

Attribution

Bibliography

External links
 

1850 births
1935 deaths
19th-century American non-fiction writers
19th-century American women writers
19th-century American newspaper editors
19th-century American newspaper founders
19th-century American newspaper publishers (people)
20th-century American non-fiction writers
20th-century American women writers
20th-century American newspaper editors
20th-century American newspaper publishers (people)
Writers from Boston
Journalists from Massachusetts
Pseudonymous women writers
Women newspaper editors
Clubwomen
Women's page journalists
19th-century pseudonymous writers
20th-century pseudonymous writers
The Boston Post people